These are the lists of monuments in Georgia found on the Ministry of Culture and Monument Protection. They are sorted by their location in their respective local council.

List
Kvemo Kartli
 Rustavi
 Dmanisi
 Marneuli
 Bolnisi
 Gardabani
 Tsalka
 Tetritsqaro

References